Rožnov Castle is a ruined castle located in Rožnov pod Radhoštěm, Czech Republic. It was constructed in the 14th century. The castle has not been used since the 17th century, after that the townspeople used the castle for home building materials.

References 

Castles in the Zlín Region
Vsetín District